Kowea Itim le-Tora Synagogue was an Orthodox Jewish synagogue in Kazimierz, Kraków, Poland. It was built in 1810 and renovated in 1912. The synagogue was devastated during World War II by Nazis. The building now serves as an apartment building.

Synagogues in Kraków
Holocaust locations in Poland
Orthodox synagogues in Poland